Liolaemus jamesi, James's tree iguana, is a species of lizard in the family Iguanidae.  It is found in Chile and Bolivia.

References

jamesi
Lizards of South America
Reptiles of Chile
Reptiles described in 1891
Taxa named by George Albert Boulenger